Hypochloremia (or Hypochloraemia) is an electrolyte disturbance in which there is an abnormally low level of the chloride ion in the blood. The normal serum range for chloride is 97 to 107 mEq/L.

It rarely occurs in the absence of other abnormalities. It is sometimes associated with hypoventilation. It can be associated with chronic respiratory acidosis. If it occurs together with metabolic alkalosis (decreased blood acidity) it is often due to vomiting. It is usually the result of hyponatremia or elevated bicarbonate concentration. It occurs in cystic fibrosis.

References

External links 

Electrolyte disturbances